The 2008 Thomas & Uber Cup qualification was held in February 2008 to determine another ten places for the men's and women's tournaments for the 2008 Thomas & Uber Cup along with China and Indonesia as defending champion and host. Each confederation held a qualifying tournament in a fixed venue to determine the places allocated.

Africa
The tournament was held in Rose Hill, Mauritius, from February 18 to February 22, 2008, having moved from Kenya because of security concerns. The winner in the final was given a place in the final tournament.

Thomas Cup

Groups

Group A

Group B

Knockout stage

Uber Cup

Group

Knockout stage

Asia
The tournament was held in Ho Chi Minh City, Vietnam, from February 18 to February 24, 2008. 14 teams participated in the men's event and 11 in the women's. The Hong Kong women's team went through to the final tournament based on a higher team ranking than Scotland.

Thomas Cup

Groups

Group A

Group B

Group C

Group D

Knockout stage

Classification

Uber Cup

Groups

Group W

Group X

Group Y

Group Z

Knockout stage

Classification

Europe

The 2008 European Men's and Women's Team Badminton Championships also served as qualification for the 2008 Thomas & Uber Cup. Denmark, England and Germany went through to the final tournament for men. In the women's competition, Denmark, Netherlands and Germany went through to the final tournament.

Oceania
The tournament was held on February 8, 2008, in Nouméa, New Caledonia. Only two teams took part in the tournament, New Zealand and Australia. The winner won a place in the final tournament.

Thomas Cup

Uber Cup

Americas
The tournament was held from February 16 to February 18, 2008, in Campinas, Brazil. Four teams participated: Brazil, Canada, Peru and the United States. The winner in the final went through to the final tournament.

Thomas Cup

Group

Classification

Uber Cup

Group

Classification

References

External links
Thomas & Uber Cups Preliminaries Asia Zone 2008
2008 Thomas and Uber Cup Preliminaries (Oceania)
Thomas & Uber Cups Regional 2008 (Americas)

Thomas and Amp Uber Cup Qualification, 2008